Halanaerobium sehlinense is a Gram-negative, strictly anaerobic, extremely halophilic, rod-shaped, non-spore-forming and non-motile bacterium from the genus of Halanaerobium which has been isolated from sediments from the Sahline Sebkha in Tunisia.

References

Clostridia
Bacteria described in 2013